Patricia Lattanzio  is a Canadian politician and lawyer of Italian descent, who was elected to the House of Commons of Canada in the 2019 Canadian federal election. She represents the electoral district of Saint-Léonard—Saint-Michel as a member of the Liberal Party of Canada.

She previously served on Montreal City Council, first winning her seat in a by-election on November 15, 2015, and was subsequently re-elected in the 2017 municipal election.

She served on the English Montreal School Board EMSB in 2007, and was re-elected in 2014. She was also the chair of the Comité de gestion de la taxe scolaire de l’île de Montréal.

Early life
Lattanzio grew up in Saint-Léonard, in the riding she now represents in the House of Commons. As a young woman, she became involved in Michel Bissonnet's 1978 mayoral campaign in Saint-Léonard. She continued to volunteer on the subsequent electoral campaigns of Michel Bissonnet as MNA for the constituency of Jeanne-Mance–Viger.

She pursued studies at McGill University where she received a bachelor's degree with honours in political science. Later, she obtained a bachelor's degree in law from the University of Quebec at Montreal and a certificate in law from the University of Montreal. Lattanzio has been a member of the Quebec bar since 1990 and has practiced in the field of civil law for over 29 years.

Political career

In 2004, she joined the governing board of École Honoré-Mercier, her children's elementary school. In 2007, she was elected school board commissioner for the Rivière-des-Prairies region at the English Montreal School Board, the largest English-language school board in Quebec. In 2014, she was elected to the same position, this time as the representative for the riding of Saint-Léonard. She was also voted president of the Comité de gestion de la taxe scolaire de l’île de Montréal, an organization run jointly by all of the school boards in the Montreal region.

In 2015, Lattanzio was elected city councillor for Saint-Léonard East in a by-election under the banner of Team Denis Coderre. She was re-elected as city councillor in the 2017 municipal election.

In 2019, she became the Liberal candidate for the riding of Saint-Léonard—St-Michel and was elected with the largest majority in the province of Quebec.

In February 2020, she was appointed to the Standing Committee on Official Languages and to the Standing Joint Committee for the Scrutiny of Regulations. She was re-appointed to the Official Languages Committee in October 2020, and was also appointed to the Committee on Access to Information, Privacy and Ethics.

As a member of the Official Languages Committee, she and other members of Parliament pressured Statistics Canada to amend the 2021 census to include questions used to identify official language minority communities. These questions were ultimately included in the 2021 census.

Lattanzio is fluent in three languages: English, French and Italian.

Electoral record

Federal

References

External links

Living people
Montreal city councillors
Women in Quebec politics
Women municipal councillors in Canada
People from Saint-Leonard, Quebec
Quebec school board members
21st-century Canadian politicians
21st-century Canadian women politicians
Year of birth missing (living people)
Women members of the House of Commons of Canada
Members of the House of Commons of Canada from Quebec
Liberal Party of Canada MPs
Lawyers from Montreal
Canadian women lawyers
McGill University alumni
Université de Montréal alumni
Université du Québec à Montréal alumni